Igoshin or Igošins is a Russian masculine surname, its feminine counterpart is Igoshina. It may refer to
Igor Igoshin (born 1970), Russian politician
Konstantīns Igošins (born 1971), Latvian football player
Maksim Igoshin (born 1978), Russian football player
Valentina Igoshina (born 1978), Russian classical pianist

Russian-language surnames